Kissi Kama Chiefdom is a chiefdom in Kailahun District of Sierra Leone. Its capital is Dea.

References 

Chiefdoms of Sierra Leone
Eastern Province, Sierra Leone